is the fifth studio album by Japanese J-pop singer and songwriter Maki Ohguro. It was released on 19 July 1995 under B-Gram Records.

Album consist of two previously released singles, La La La and Ichiban Chikaku ni Itene. "La La La" is one of her most iconic songs as singer, and sold more than million copies. "Ichiban Chikaku ni Itene" has received special album mix under the title Carnival version.

The album reached No. 1 in its first week on the Oricon chart. The album sold 1,618,000 copies. This makes it her second studio album which sold more than one million copies. It got rewarded with Gold disc by Recording Industry Association of Japan.

Track listing
All tracks arranged by Takeshi Hayama.

In media
La La La: theme song for TV Asahi television drama Aji Ichi Monme

References

Being Inc. albums
Japanese-language albums
1995 albums
Maki Ohguro albums